Malinówka  is a village in the administrative district of Gmina Sawin within Chełm County, Lublin Voivodeship, in eastern Poland.

References

Villages in Chełm County